Symmoca straminella is a moth of the family Autostichidae. It is found in Syria and Turkey.

References

External links

Moths described in 1986
Symmoca
Insects of Turkey